Thomas Arthur Bones (1835 in Theresa, New York – 1 January 1923, Washington D.C.) was a member of the Wisconsin State Senate.

He attended Racine College. During the American Civil War, he served in the Union Army.

Career
Bones was elected to the Senate in 1876. He was a Republican. Bones married Marietta Matilda Wilkins in 1881 in Washington DC. Their son Thomas Philip was born in 1885 in Webster, South Dakota. Marietta died in Washington DC. on January 1, 1923 at the age of 87 and is buried at the Arlington National Cemetery.

References

1835 births
1923 deaths
People from Theresa, New York
Republican Party Wisconsin state senators
People of Wisconsin in the American Civil War
Racine College alumni